Australians in Singapore consists of immigrants from Australia and Singaporean citizens of Australian descent. As of October 2012, there are about 20,000 Australians living in Singapore.

Migration history
Despite a mining boom and a strong economy at home, an increasing number of Australians have left for jobs and promotion opportunities in Asia and elsewhere. Many left for Singapore due to the growth of the country's economy and its population slowing has made it more of a destination. However, many of the Australians who move to Singapore are likely to retain their Australian citizenship and would eventually move to another country or return to Australia.

In 2001, about 2,325 Australians left for Singapore. Since then, the number has jumped to 5,431 in 2008, 6,428 in 2009 and 6,952 in 2011.

Australians are well represented in online media and on Mediacorp television. The Television channel, ABC Australia is broadcast in Singapore.

Notable people
 Patrick Grove – Australian internet and new media entrepreneur.
 Jaymee Ong – Australian model and actress.

See also

 Singaporean Australians
 Australia–Singapore relations

References

Singapore
Ethnic groups in Singapore
Australian expatriates in Singapore
Australia–Singapore relations
Australia